The Tower of Babel (Mīgdal Bāḇel) narrative in Genesis 11:1–9 is an origin myth and parable meant to explain why the world's peoples speak different languages.

According to the story, a united human race speaking a single language and migrating eastward, comes to the land of Shinar. There they agree to build a city and a tower with its top in the sky. Yahweh, observing their city and tower, confounds their speech so that they can no longer understand each other, and scatters them around the world.

Some modern scholars have associated the Tower of Babel with known structures, notably Etemenanki, a ziggurat dedicated to the Mesopotamian god Marduk in Babylon. While the archaeological record is incompatible with this identification, many scholars believe that the biblical story was inspired by Etemenanki. A Sumerian story with some similar elements is told in Enmerkar and the Lord of Aratta.

Narrative

Etymology 
The phrase "Tower of Babel" does not appear in the Bible; it is always "the city and the tower" or just "the city". The original derivation of the name Babel (also the Hebrew name for Babylon) is uncertain. The native, Akkadian name of the city was Bāb-ilim, meaning "gate of God". However, that form and interpretation itself are now usually thought to be the result of an Akkadian folk etymology applied to an earlier form of the name, Babilla, of unknown meaning and probably non-Semitic origin. According to the Bible, the city received the name "Babel" from the Hebrew verb בָּלַל (bālal), meaning to jumble or to confuse.

Composition

Genre 
The narrative of the tower of Babel is an etiology or explanation of a phenomenon. Etiologies are narratives that explain the origin of a custom, ritual, geographical feature, name, or other phenomenon. The story of the Tower of Babel explains the origins of the multiplicity of languages. God was concerned that humans had blasphemed by building the tower to avoid a second flood so God brought into existence multiple languages. Thus, humans were divided into linguistic groups, unable to understand one another.

Themes 
The story's theme of competition between God and humans appears elsewhere in Genesis, in the story of Adam and Eve in the Garden of Eden. The 1st-century Jewish interpretation found in Flavius Josephus explains the construction of the tower as a hubristic act of defiance against God ordered by the arrogant tyrant Nimrod. There have, however, been some contemporary challenges to this classical interpretation, with emphasis placed on the explicit motive of cultural and linguistic homogeneity mentioned in the narrative (v. 1, 4, 6). This reading of the text sees God's actions not as a punishment for pride, but as an etiology of cultural differences, presenting Babel as the cradle of civilization.

Authorship and source criticism 
Jewish and Christian tradition attributes the composition of the whole Pentateuch, which includes the story of the Tower of Babel, to Moses. Modern biblical scholarship rejects Mosaic authorship of the Pentateuch, but is divided on the question of its authorship. Many scholars subscribe to some form of the documentary hypothesis, which argues that the Pentateuch is composed of multiple "sources" that were later merged. Scholars who favor this hypothesis, such as Richard Elliot Friedman, tend to see the Genesis 11:1–9 as being composed by the J or Jahwist/Yahwist source. Michael Coogan suggests the intentional word play regarding the city of Babel, and the noise of the people's "babbling" is found in the Hebrew words as easily as in English, is considered typical of the Yahwist source. John Van Seters, who has put forth substantial modifications to the hypothesis, suggests that these verses are part of what he calls a "Pre-Yahwistic stage". Other scholars reject the documentary hypothesis all together. The "minimalist" scholars tend to see the books of Genesis through 2 Kings as written by a single, anonymous author during the Hellenistic period.

Comparable myths

Sumerian and Assyrian parallel 
There is a Sumerian myth similar to that of the Tower of Babel, called Enmerkar and the Lord of Aratta, where
Enmerkar of Uruk is building a massive ziggurat in Eridu and demands a tribute of precious materials from Aratta for its construction, at one point reciting an incantation imploring the god Enki to restore (or in Kramer's translation, to disrupt) the linguistic unity of the inhabited regions—named as Shubur, Hamazi, Sumer, Uri-ki (Akkad), and the Martu land, "the whole universe, the well-guarded people—may they all address Enlil together in a single language."

In addition, a further Assyrian myth, dating from the 8th century BC during the Neo-Assyrian Empire (911–605 BC), bears a number of similarities to the later written biblical story.

Greco-Roman parallel 

In Greek mythology, much of which was adopted by the Romans, there is a myth referred to as the Gigantomachy, the battle fought between the Giants and the Olympian gods for supremacy of the cosmos. In Ovid's telling of the myth, the Giants attempt to reach the gods in heaven by stacking mountains, but are repelled by Jupiter's thunderbolts. A.S. Kline translates Ovid's Metamorphoses 1.151-155 as:

"Rendering the heights of heaven no safer than the earth, they say the giants attempted to take the Celestial kingdom, piling mountains up to the distant stars. Then the all-powerful father of the gods hurled his bolt of lightning, fractured Olympus and threw Mount Pelion down from Ossa below."

Mexico 
Various traditions similar to that of the tower of Babel are found in Central America. Some writers connected the Great Pyramid of Cholula to the Tower of Babel. The Dominican friar Diego Durán (1537–1588) reported hearing an account about the pyramid from a hundred-year-old priest at Cholula, shortly after the conquest of the Aztec Empire. He wrote that he was told when the light of the sun first appeared upon the land, giants appeared and set off in search of the sun. Not finding it, they built a tower to reach the sky. An angered God of the Heavens called upon the inhabitants of the sky, who destroyed the tower and scattered its inhabitants. The story was not related to either a flood or the confusion of languages, although Frazer connects its construction and the scattering of the giants with the Tower of Babel.

Another story, attributed by the native historian Fernando de Alva Cortés Ixtlilxóchitl (c. 1565–1648) to the ancient Toltecs, states that after men had multiplied following a great deluge, they erected a tall zacuali or tower, to preserve themselves in the event of a second deluge. However, their languages were confounded and they went to separate parts of the earth.

Arizona 
Still another story, attributed to the Tohono O'odham people, holds that Montezuma escaped a great flood, then became wicked and attempted to build a house reaching to heaven, but the Great Spirit destroyed it with thunderbolts.

Nepal 
Traces of a somewhat similar story have also been reported among the Tharu of Nepal and northern India.

Botswana
According to David Livingstone, the people he met living near Lake Ngami in 1849 had such a tradition, but with the builders' heads getting "cracked by the fall of the scaffolding".

Other traditions
In his 1918 book, Folklore in the Old Testament, Scottish social anthropologist Sir James George Frazer documented similarities between Old Testament stories, such as the Flood, and indigenous legends around the world. He identified Livingston's account with a tale found in Lozi mythology, wherein the wicked men build a tower of masts to pursue the Creator-God, Nyambe, who has fled to Heaven on a spider-web, but the men perish when the masts collapse. He further relates similar tales of the Ashanti that substitute a pile of porridge pestles for the masts. Frazer moreover cites such legends found among the Kongo people, as well as in Tanzania, where the men stack poles or trees in a failed attempt to reach the moon. He further cited the Karbi and Kuki people of Assam as having a similar story. The traditions of the Karen people of Myanmar, which Frazer considered to show clear 'Abrahamic' influence, also relate that their ancestors migrated there following the abandonment of a great pagoda in the land of the Karenni 30 generations from Adam, when the languages were confused and the Karen separated from the Karenni. He notes yet another version current in the Admiralty Islands, where mankind's languages are confused following a failed attempt to build houses reaching to heaven.

Mythological context 

Biblical scholars see the Book of Genesis as mythological and not as a historical account of events. Genesis is described as beginning with historicized myth and ending with mythicized history. Nevertheless, the story of Babel can be interpreted in terms of its context.

Genesis 10:10 states that Babel (LXX: Βαβυλών) formed part of Nimrod's kingdom. The Bible does not specifically mention that Nimrod ordered the building of the tower, but many other sources have associated its construction with Nimrod.

Genesis 11:9 attributes the Hebrew version of the name, Babel, to the verb balal, which means to confuse or confound in Hebrew. The first century Roman-Jewish author Flavius Josephus similarly explained that the name was derived from the Hebrew word Babel (בבל), meaning "confusion".

Etemenanki, the ziggurat at Babylon 

Etemenanki (Sumerian: "temple of the foundation of heaven and earth") was the name of a ziggurat dedicated to Marduk in the city of Babylon. It was famously rebuilt by the 6th-century-BCE Neo-Babylonian dynasty rulers Nabopolassar and Nebuchadnezzar II, but had fallen into disrepair by the time of Alexander's conquests. He managed to move the tiles of the tower to another location, but his death stopped the reconstruction, and it was demolished during the reign of his successor Antiochus Soter. The Greek historian Herodotus (c. 484 – c. 425 BC) wrote an account of the ziggurat in his Histories, which he called the "Temple of Zeus Belus".

According to modern scholars, the biblical story of the Tower of Babel was likely influenced by Etemenanki. 
Stephen L. Harris proposed this occurred during the Babylonian captivity. Isaac Asimov speculated that the authors of Genesis 11:1-9 were inspired by the existence of an apparently incomplete ziggurat at Babylon, and by the phonological similarity between Babylonian Bab-ilu, meaning "gate of God", and the Hebrew word balal, meaning "mixed", "confused", or "confounded".

Later literature

Book of Jubilees 
The Book of Jubilees contains one of the most detailed accounts found anywhere of the Tower.
And they began to build, and in the fourth week they made brick with fire, and the bricks served them for stone, and the clay with which they cemented them together was asphalt which comes out of the sea, and out of the fountains of water in the land of Shinar. And they built it: forty and three years were they building it; its breadth was 203 bricks, and the height [of a brick] was the third of one; its height amounted to 5433 cubits and 2 palms, and [the extent of one wall was] thirteen stades [and of the other thirty stades]. (Jubilees 10:20–21, Charles' 1913 translation)

Pseudo-Philo 
In Pseudo-Philo, the direction for the building is ascribed not only to Nimrod, who is made prince of the Hamites, but also to Joktan, as prince of the Semites, and to Phenech son of Dodanim, as prince of the Japhetites. Twelve men are arrested for refusing to bring bricks, including Abraham, Lot, Nahor, and several sons of Joktan. However, Joktan finally saves the twelve from the wrath of the other two princes.

Josephus' Antiquities of the Jews 

The Jewish-Roman historian Flavius Josephus, in his Antiquities of the Jews (c. 94 CE), recounted history as found in the Hebrew Bible and mentioned the Tower of Babel. He wrote that it was Nimrod who had the tower built and that Nimrod was a tyrant who tried to turn the people away from God. In this account, God confused the people rather than destroying them because annihilation with a Flood had not taught them to be godly.Now it was Nimrod who excited them to such an affront and contempt of God. He was the grandson of Ham, the son of Noah, a bold man, and of great strength of hand. He persuaded them not to ascribe it to God as if it were through his means they were happy, but to believe that it was their own courage which procured that happiness. He also gradually changed the government into tyranny, seeing no other way of turning men from the fear of God, but to bring them into a constant dependence on his power... Now the multitude were very ready to follow the determination of Nimrod and to esteem it a piece of cowardice to submit to God; and they built a tower, neither sparing any pains, nor being in any degree negligent about the work: and, by reason of the multitude of hands employed in it, it grew very high, sooner than any one could expect; but the thickness of it was so great, and it was so strongly built, that thereby its great height seemed, upon the view, to be less than it really was. It was built of burnt brick, cemented together with mortar, made of bitumen, that it might not be liable to admit water. When God saw that they acted so madly, he did not resolve to destroy them utterly, since they were not grown wiser by the destruction of the former sinners [in the Flood]; but he caused a tumult among them, by producing in them diverse languages, and causing that, through the multitude of those languages, they should not be able to understand one another. The place wherein they built the tower is now called Babylon, because of the confusion of that language which they readily understood before; for the Hebrews mean by the word Babel, confusion. The Sibyl also makes mention of this tower, and of the confusion of the language, when she says thus:—"When all men were of one language, some of them built a high tower, as if they would thereby ascend up to heaven; but the gods sent storms of wind and overthrew the tower, and gave everyone a peculiar language; and for this reason it was that the city was called Babylon."

Greek Apocalypse of Baruch 
Third Apocalypse of Baruch (or 3 Baruch, c. 2nd century), one of the pseudepigrapha, describes the just rewards of sinners and the righteous in the afterlife. Among the sinners are those who instigated the Tower of Babel. In the account, Baruch is first taken (in a vision) to see the resting place of the souls of "those who built the tower of strife against God, and the Lord banished them." Next he is shown another place, and there, occupying the form of dogs,
Those who gave counsel to build the tower, for they whom thou seest drove forth multitudes of both men and women, to make bricks; among whom, a woman making bricks was not allowed to be released in the hour of child-birth, but brought forth while she was making bricks, and carried her child in her apron, and continued to make bricks. And the Lord appeared to them and confused their speech, when they had built the tower to the height of four hundred and sixty-three cubits. And they took a gimlet, and sought to pierce the heavens, saying, Let us see (whether) the heaven is made of clay, or of brass, or of iron. When God saw this He did not permit them, but smote them with blindness and confusion of speech, and rendered them as thou seest. (Greek Apocalypse of Baruch, 3:5–8)

Midrash 
Rabbinic literature offers many different accounts of other causes for building the Tower of Babel, and of the intentions of its builders. According to one midrash the builders of the Tower, called "the generation of secession" in the Jewish sources, said: "God has no right to choose the upper world for Himself, and to leave the lower world to us; therefore we will build us a tower, with an idol on the top holding a sword, so that it may appear as if it intended to war with God" (Gen. R. xxxviii. 7; Tan., ed. Buber, Noah, xxvii. et seq.).

The building of the Tower was meant to bid defiance not only to God, but also to Abraham, who exhorted the builders to reverence. The passage mentions that the builders spoke sharp words against God, saying that once every 1,656 years, heaven tottered so that the water poured down upon the earth, therefore they would support it by columns that there might not be another deluge (Gen. R. l.c.; Tan. l.c.; similarly Josephus, "Ant." i. 4, § 2).

Some among that generation even wanted to war against God in heaven (Talmud Sanhedrin 109a). They were encouraged in this undertaking by the notion that arrows that they shot into the sky fell back dripping with blood, so that the people really believed that they could wage war against the inhabitants of the heavens (Sefer ha-Yashar, Chapter 9:12–36). According to Josephus and Midrash Pirke R. El. xxiv., it was mainly Nimrod who persuaded his contemporaries to build the Tower, while other rabbinical sources assert, on the contrary, that Nimrod separated from the builders.

According to another midrashic account, one third of the Tower builders were punished by being transformed into semi-demonic creatures and banished into three parallel dimensions, inhabited now by their descendants.

Islamic tradition 

Although not mentioned by name, the Quran has a story with similarities to the biblical story of the Tower of Babel, although set in the Egypt of Moses: Pharaoh asks Haman to build him a stone (or clay) tower so that he can mount up to heaven and confront the God of Moses.

Another story in Sura 2:102 mentions the name of Babil, but tells of when the two angels Harut and Marut taught magic to some people in Babylon and warned them that magic is a sin and that their teaching them magic is a test of faith.
In the History of the Prophets and Kings by the 9th-century Muslim theologian al-Tabari, a fuller version is given: Nimrod has the tower built in Babil, God destroys it, and the language of mankind, formerly Syriac, is then confused into 72 languages. Another Muslim historian of the 13th century, Abu al-Fida relates the same story, adding that the patriarch Eber (an ancestor of Abraham) was allowed to keep the original tongue, Hebrew in this case, because he would not partake in the building.

Although variations similar to the biblical narrative of the Tower of Babel exist within Islamic tradition, the central theme of God separating humankind on the basis of language is alien to Islam according to the author Yahiya Emerick. In Islamic belief, he argues, God created nations to know each other and not to be separated.

Book of Mormon
In the Book of Mormon, a man named Jared and his family ask God that their language not be confounded at the time of the "great tower". Because of their prayers, God preserves their language and leads them to the Valley of Nimrod. From there, they travel across the sea to the Americas.

Despite no mention of the Tower of Babel in the original text of the Book of Mormon, some leaders in the Church of Jesus Christ of Latter-day Saints (LDS Church) assert that the "great tower" was indeed the Tower of Babel – as in the 1981 introduction to the Book of Mormon – despite the chronology of the Book of Ether aligning more closely with the 21st century BC Sumerian tower temple myth of Enmerkar and the Lord of Aratta to the goddess Innana. Church apologists have also supported this connection and argue the reality of the Tower of Babel: "Although there are many in our day who consider the accounts of the Flood and tower of Babel to be fiction, Latter-day Saints affirm their reality." In either case, the church firmly believes in the factual nature of at least one "great tower" built in the region of ancient Sumeria/Assyria/Babylonia.

Gnosticism
In Gnostic tradition recorded in the Paraphrase of Shem, a tower, interpreted as the Tower of Babel, is brought by demons along with the great flood:

Confusion of tongues

The confusion of tongues (confusio linguarum) is the origin myth for the fragmentation of human languages described in Genesis 11:1-9, as a result of the construction of the Tower of Babel. Prior to this event, humanity was stated to speak a single language. The preceding Genesis 10:5 states that the descendants of Japheth, Gomer, and Javan dispersed "with their own tongues." Augustine explained this apparent contradiction by arguing that the story 'without mentioning it, goes back to tell how it came about that the one language common to all men was broken up into many tongues'.  Modern scholarship has traditionally held that the two chapters were written by different sources, the former by the Priestly source and the latter by the Jahwist.  However, that theory has been debated among scholars in recent years.

During the Middle Ages, the Hebrew language was widely considered the language used by God to address Adam in Paradise, and by Adam as lawgiver (the Adamic language) by various Jewish, Christian, and Muslim scholastics.

Dante Alighieri addresses the topic in his De vulgari eloquentia (1302–1305). He argues that the Adamic language is of divine origin and therefore unchangeable.

In his Divine Comedy (c. 1308–1320), however, Dante changes his view to another that treats the Adamic language as the product of Adam. This had the consequence that it could no longer be regarded as immutable, and hence Hebrew could not be regarded as identical with the language of Paradise. Dante concludes (Paradiso XXVI) that Hebrew is a derivative of the language of Adam. In particular, the chief Hebrew name for God in scholastic tradition, El, must be derived of a different Adamic name for God, which Dante gives as I.

Before the acceptance of the Indo-European language family, these languages were considered to be "Japhetite" by some authors (e.g., Rasmus Rask in 1815; see Indo-European studies). Beginning in Renaissance Europe, priority over Hebrew was claimed for the alleged Japhetic languages, which were supposedly never corrupted because their speakers had not participated in the construction of the Tower of Babel. Among the candidates for a living descendant of the Adamic language were: Gaelic (see Auraicept na n-Éces); Tuscan (Giovanni Battista Gelli, 1542, Piero Francesco Giambullari, 1564); Dutch (Goropius Becanus, 1569, Abraham Mylius, 1612); Swedish (Olaus Rudbeck, 1675); German (Georg Philipp Harsdörffer, 1641, Schottel, 1641). The Swedish physician Andreas Kempe wrote a satirical tract in 1688, where he made fun of the contest between the European nationalists to claim their native tongue as the Adamic language. Caricaturing the attempts by the Swede Olaus Rudbeck to pronounce Swedish the original language of mankind, Kempe wrote a scathing parody where Adam spoke Danish, God spoke Swedish, and the serpent French.

Linguistics 

For a long time, historical linguistics wrestled with the idea of a single original language. In the Middle Ages and down to the 17th century, attempts were made to identify a living descendant of the Adamic language.

Multiplication of languages

The literal belief that the world's linguistic variety originated with the tower of Babel is pseudolinguistics, and is contrary to the known facts about the origin and history of languages.

In the biblical introduction of the Tower of Babel account, in Genesis 11:1, it is said that everyone on Earth spoke the same language, but this is inconsistent with the biblical description of the post-Noahic world described in Genesis 10:5, where it is said that the descendants of Shem, Ham, and Japheth gave rise to different nations, each with their own language.

There have also been a number of traditions around the world that describe a divine confusion of the one original language into several, albeit without any tower. Aside from the Ancient Greek myth that Hermes confused the languages, causing Zeus to give his throne to Phoroneus, Frazer specifically mentions such accounts among the Wasania of Kenya, the Kacha Naga people of Assam, the inhabitants of Encounter Bay in Australia, the Maidu of California, the Tlingit of Alaska, and the K'iche' Maya of Guatemala.

The Estonian myth of "the Cooking of Languages" has also been compared.

Enumeration of scattered languages
There are several mediaeval historiographic accounts that attempt to make an enumeration of the languages scattered at the Tower of Babel. Because a count of all the descendants of Noah listed by name in chapter 10 of Genesis (LXX) provides 15 names for Japheth's descendants, 30 for Ham's, and 27 for Shem's, these figures became established as the 72 languages resulting from the confusion at Babel—although the exact listing of these languages changed over time. (The LXX Bible has two additional names, Elisa and Cainan, not found in the Masoretic text of this chapter, so early rabbinic traditions, such as the Mishna, speak instead of "70 languages".) Some of the earliest sources for 72 (sometimes 73) languages are the 2nd-century Christian writers Clement of Alexandria (Stromata I, 21) and Hippolytus of Rome (On the Psalms 9); it is repeated in the Syriac book Cave of Treasures (c. 350 CE), Epiphanius of Salamis' Panarion (c. 375) and St. Augustine's The City of God 16.6 (c. 410). The chronicles attributed to Hippolytus (c. 234) contain one of the first attempts to list each of the 72 peoples who were believed to have spoken these languages.

Isidore of Seville in his Etymologiae (c. 600) mentions the number of 72; however, his list of names from the Bible drops the sons of Joktan and substitutes the sons of Abraham and Lot, resulting in only about 56 names total; he then appends a list of some of the nations known in his own day, such as the Longobards and the Franks. This listing was to prove quite influential on later accounts that made the Lombards and Franks themselves into descendants of eponymous grandsons of Japheth, e.g. the Historia Brittonum (c. 833), The Meadows of Gold by al Masudi (c. 947) and Book of Roads and Kingdoms by al-Bakri (1068), the 11th-century Lebor Gabála Érenn, and the midrashic compilations Yosippon (c. 950), Chronicles of Jerahmeel, and Sefer haYashar.

Other sources that mention 72 (or 70) languages scattered from Babel are the Old Irish poem Cu cen mathair by Luccreth moccu Chiara (c. 600); the Irish monastic work Auraicept na n-Éces; History of the Prophets and Kings by the Persian historian Muhammad ibn Jarir al-Tabari (c. 915); the Anglo-Saxon dialogue Solomon and Saturn; the Russian Primary Chronicle (c. 1113); the Jewish Kabbalistic work Bahir (1174); the Prose Edda of Snorri Sturluson (c. 1200); the Syriac Book of the Bee (c. 1221); the Gesta Hunnorum et Hungarorum (c. 1284; mentions 22 for Shem, 31 for Ham and 17 for Japheth for a total of 70); Villani's 1300 account; and the rabbinic Midrash ha-Gadol (14th century). Villani adds that it "was begun 700 years after the Flood, and there were 2,354 years from the beginning of the world to the confusion of the Tower of Babel. And we find that they were 107 years working at it; and men lived long in those times". According to the Gesta Hunnorum et Hungarorum, however, the project was begun only 200 years following the Deluge.

The tradition of 72 languages persisted into later times. Both José de Acosta in his 1576 treatise De procuranda indorum salute, and António Vieira a century later in his Sermão da Epifania, expressed amazement at how much this 'number of tongues' could be surpassed, there being hundreds of mutually unintelligible languages indigenous only to Peru and Brazil.

Height
The Book of Genesis does not mention how tall the tower was. The phrase used to describe the tower, "its top in the sky" (v.4), was an idiom for impressive height; rather than implying arrogance, this was simply a cliché for height.

Gregory of Tours writing c. 594, quotes the earlier historian Orosius (c. 417) as saying the tower was "laid out foursquare on a very level plain. Its wall, made of baked brick cemented with pitch, is fifty cubits (23 m or 75 ft) wide, two hundred (91.5 m or 300 ft) high, and four hundred and seventy stades (82.72 km or 51.4 miles) in circumference. Twenty-five gates are situated on each side, which make in all one hundred. The doors of these gates, which are of wonderful size, are cast in bronze. The same historian tells many other tales of this city, and says: 'Although such was the glory of its building still it was conquered and destroyed.'"

He also quotes unnamed authors who say that the spiral path was so wide that it contained lodgings for workers and animals, and other authors who claim that the path was wide enough to have fields for growing grain for the animals used in the construction.

In his book, Structures: Or Why Things Don't Fall Down (Pelican 1978–1984), Professor J.E. Gordon considers the height of the Tower of Babel. He wrote, "brick and stone weigh about 120 lb per cubic foot (2,000 kg per cubic metre) and the crushing strength of these materials is generally rather better than 6,000 lbs per square inch or 40 mega-pascals. Elementary arithmetic shows that a tower with parallel walls could have been built to a height of  before the bricks at the bottom were crushed. However, by making the walls taper towards the top they ... could well have been built to a height where the men of Shinnar would run short of oxygen and had difficulty in breathing before the brick walls crushed beneath their own dead weight."

In popular culture
Pieter Brueghel's influential portrayal is based on the Colosseum in Rome, while later conical depictions of the tower (as depicted in Doré's illustration) resemble much later Muslim towers observed by 19th-century explorers in the area, notably the Minaret of Samarra. M.C. Escher depicts a more stylized geometrical structure in his woodcut representing the story.
The composer Anton Rubinstein wrote an opera based on the story Der Thurm zu Babel.
American choreographer Adam Darius staged a multilingual theatrical interpretation of The Tower of Babel in 1993 at the ICA in London.
Fritz Lang's 1927 film Metropolis, in a flashback, plays upon themes of lack of communication between the designers of the tower and the workers who are constructing it. The short scene states how the words used to glorify the tower's construction by its designers took on totally different, oppressive meanings to the workers. This led to its destruction as they rose up against the designers because of the insufferable working conditions. The appearance of the tower was modeled after Brueghel's 1563 painting.
The political philosopher Michael Oakeshott surveyed historic variations of the Tower of Babel in different cultures and produced a modern retelling of his own in his 1983 book, On History. In his retelling, Oakeshott expresses disdain for human willingness to sacrifice individuality, culture, and quality of life for grand collective projects. He attributes this behavior to fascination with novelty, persistent dissatisfaction, greed, and lack of self-reflection.
A.S. Byatt's novel Babel Tower (1996) is about the question "whether language can be shared, or, if that turns out to be illusory, how individuals, in talking to each other, fail to understand each other".
The progressive band Soul Secret wrote a concept album called BABEL, based on a modernized version of the myth.
Science fiction writer Ted Chiang wrote a story called "Tower of Babylon" that imagined a miner's climbing the tower all the way to the top where he meets the vault of heaven.
Fantasy novelist Josiah Bancroft has a series The Books of Babel, which concluded with book IV in 2021.
The Tower of Babel appears in the 47th episode of the anime series Arabian Nights: Sinbad's Adventures.
This biblical episode is dramatized in the Indian television series Bible Ki Kahaniyan, which aired on DD National from 1992.
Chris Huelsbeck, the composer for the music appearing in several parts of the Turrican game series, has created an orchestral piece titled "Tower of Babel" which appears in Turrican II: The Final Fight. 
In the 1990 Japanese television anime Nadia: The Secret of Blue Water, the Tower of Babel is used by the Atlanteans as an interstellar communication device. Later in the series, the Neo Atlanteans rebuild the Tower of Babel and use its communication beam as a weapon of mass destruction. Both the original and the rebuilt tower resembles the painting Tower of Babel by artist Pieter Bruegel the Elder.
In the video game Prince of Persia: The Two Thrones the last stages of the game and the final boss fight occur in the tower.
In the web-based game Forge of Empires the Tower of Babel is an available "Great Building".
Argentinian novelist Jorge Luis Borges wrote a story called "The Library of Babel".
The Tower of Babel appears as an important location in the Babylonian story arc of the Japanese shōjo manga Crest of the Royal Family.
In the video game series Doom, the Tower of Babel appears multiple times. In Doom (1993), the level "E2M8" is named and takes place at the "Tower of Babel". In Doom Eternal the campaign level "Nekravol" contains the Tower of Babel, but instead of its biblical purpose, it functions as a processing line for the suffering of human souls. In-game it is referred to as "The Citadel", but the concept art for Doom Eternal (The Art of Doom Eternal artbook, and the Steam Trading Card) refers to it as the "Tower Babel".
2017 comic book La tour de Bab-El-Oued (The tower of Bab-El-Oued) from Sfar's The Rabbi's Cat series refers to the Tower of Babel in a context of intercultural conflict and cooperation (Jews and Muslims during the French colonization in Algeria).
The fragmentation of modern society, in part due to social media, has been likened to a modern Tower of Babel.
In the video game Doshin the Giant, the final monument the island inhabitants can create is called the Tower of Babel, which begins to sink the island. The titular Doshin the Giant then sacrifices himself to save the island.

See also  

 Babylonian astronomy
 Borsippa
 Enuma Anu Enlil
 Eridu
 Evolutionary linguistics
 List of world's tallest structures
 Minar (Firuzabad)
 Origin of speech
 Sons of Noah

Notes

References

Further reading
 
 

 .
 Ixtilxochitl, Don Ferdinand d'Alva, Historia Chichimeca, 1658
 Lord Kingsborough, Antiquities of Mexico, vol. 9
 H.H. Bancroft, Native Races of the Pacific States (New York, 1874)
 Klaus Seybold, "Der Turmbau zu Babel: Zur Entstehung von Genesis XI 1–9," Vetus Testamentum (1976).
 Samuel Noah Kramer, The "Babel of Tongues": A Sumerian Version, Journal of the American Oriental Society (1968).
 Kyle Dugdale: Babel's Present. Ed. by Reto Geiser and Tilo Richter, Standpunkte, Basel 2016,  (Standpunkte Dokumente No. 5).

External links 

"Tower of Babel." Encyclopædia Britannica Online.
Babel In Biblia: The Tower in Ancient Literature by Jim Rovira
Our People: A History of the Jews – The Tower of Babel
Book of Genesis, Chapter 11
"The Tower of Babel and the Birth of Nationhood" by Daniel Gordis at Azure: Ideas for the Jewish Nation
SkyscraperPage – Tower of Babel, Tower of Babel – Baruch
HERBARIUM Art Project. Anatomy of the Tower of Babel. 2010
The International Standard Bible Encyclopedia (ISBE), James Orr, M.A., D.D., General Editor – 1915 (online)
Easton's Bible Dictionary, M.G. Easton M.A., D.D., published by Thomas Nelson, 1897. (online)
Nave Topical Bible, Orville J. Nave, AM., D.D., LL.D. (online)
Smith's Bible Dictionary (1896) (online)

 
Babylon
Biblical phrases
Book of Genesis
Fictional towers
Ancient Mesopotamia
Origin myths
Nimrod
Noach (parashah)
Sumer
Torah places
Tower of Babel
Ziggurats
Book of Jubilees